Glyphipterix quadragintapunctata is a species of sedge moth in the genus Glyphipterix. It was described by Harrison Gray Dyar, Jr. in 1900. It is found in North America, including Illinois, Kentucky, North Carolina, Ohio, Pennsylvania and West Virginia. The habitat consists of low, shaded deciduous forest.

References

Moths described in 1900
Glyphipterigidae
Moths of North America